Roy S. Simmonds (September 16, 1925 – November 10, 2001) was an English literary scholar and critic best known for his biographies of John Steinbeck, William March and Edward O'Brien.

Works
 The Two Worlds of William March (1984).
 William March: An Annotated Checklist (1989).
 John Steinbeck: The War Years, 1939-1945 (1996).
 A Biographical and Critical Introduction of John Steinbeck (2000).
 Edward J. O’Brien and His Role in the Rise of the American Short Story in the 1920s and 1930s (2001).

References

English biographers
English historians
British bibliographers
1925 births
2001 deaths
20th-century biographers